Sabet is a village in Jaya District, Aceh Jaya Regency in Aceh. Its population is 454.

Climate
Sabet has a tropical rainforest climate (Af) with heavy rainfall year-round.

References

Villages in Indonesia
Aceh